102 Petty France is an office block on Petty France in Westminster, London, overlooking St. James's Park, which was designed by Fitzroy Robinson & Partners, with Sir Basil Spence, and completed in 1976. It was well known as the main location for the UK Home Office between 1978 and 2004, when it was known as 50 Queen Anne's Gate; it now houses departments including the Ministry of Justice, His Majesty's Courts and Tribunals Service, the Crown Prosecution Service, and the Government Legal Department.

History 
The site was previously occupied by the 14-storey mansion block Queen Anne's Mansions, which was despised by some architectural commentators: Lord Reigate, speaking in the House of Lords in 1972 against the plans for the new building, used Nikolaus Pevsner's description "that irredeemable horror". However, the new building's architecture was not favourably received, either, owing to its scale and massing with protruding elements at the upper and lower floors, often being described as a Brutalist design: it was sometimes known to those who worked there as "the Lubyanka". Fodor's guide to London described it as "hulking", and Lord St John of Fawsley remarked that "Basil Spence's barracks in Hyde Park ruined that park; in fact, he has the distinction of having ruined two parks, because of his Home Office building, which towers above St James's Park." The building originated as a speculative office development, but the Home Office moved in owing to lack of space in its previous headquarters in Whitehall.

In spring 2005, the Home Office moved to a new purpose-built building at 2 Marsham Street designed by Terry Farrell. The Queen Anne's Gate building had major refurbishment work carried out on it, whilst being under the ownership of Land Securities. It has been the home of the Ministry of Justice and the Tribunals Service since 2008, with the building renamed 102 Petty France.

References 

Buildings and structures in the City of Westminster
National government buildings in London
Brutalist architecture in London
Basil Spence buildings
1976 establishments in England
Office buildings completed in 1976